Hockey in Australia may refer to:

 Field hockey in Australia
 Ice hockey in Australia
 Underwater hockey in Australia